The Constitution Alteration (Local Government) Bill 1988, was an unsuccessful proposal to alter the Australian Constitution to recognise local government. It was put to voters for approval in a referendum held on 3 September 1988. The structure of the Constitution recognises government at federal and state levels, but makes no mention of local government.

The "no" campaign in 1988 argued that this change would undermine states' rights, i.e. that it would move – or make it possible to move – some power from state governments to local governments.

Question

A Proposed Law: To alter the Constitution to recognise local government.

Do you approve this proposed alteration?

The proposal was to add a new provision to the Constitution as follows :

Results

Discussion
This was the second unsuccessful referendum on the subject of Local Government. The 1974 referendum on Local Government Bodies sought to allow the Commonwealth to grant financial assistance to local government bodies, and to borrow money on their behalf.

See also
Politics of Australia
History of Australia

References

Further reading
  
 
 Australian Electoral Commission (2007) Referendum Dates and Results 1906 – Present AEC, Canberra.

1988 referendums
Referendum Local Governments
1988 Local Government
Proposed laws of Australia